A perak is a headdress typically worn by the old aristocracy in the Himalayan Ladakh region of Asia. It is composed of a strap of leather studded with semi-precious stones, such as lapis lazuli and turquoise.

Symbolism
The perak is a symbol among the Ladakh of the rank and economic status of the woman wearing it. Traditionally, the number of front-to-back rows of turquoise signified the status of the wearer: nine rows for the queen of Leh (the Ladakh capital), seven rows for the more modern aristocracy, five for the marvels, and three for the lower ranks.

The jewels themselves are representative of the Ladakh deities, protecting and guiding the wearer through the dangerous human world.

External links
 Perak headdress at the Victoria and Albert museum
 Picture of a perak headdress
 Review of article about perak headdresses
 Stock photo of two women wearing perak headdresses
 Flickr image of woman from Wakha village wearing a perak
 Image of an old perak from Ladakh or Zanskar

References

Headgear